Sudabeh Mohafez born 1963 in Tehran, Imperial State of Iran is a German author.

Biography
Sudabeh Mohafez studied music, English studies and pedagogy. She worked at various Non-governmental organizations in the field of violence prevention. After many years in Berlin and a few in Lisbon, she now lives as a freelance writer in Baden-Württemberg.

Sudabeh Mohafez is author of narratives, novels, poems, portraits and theaterplays. She received several literary scholarships and the Adelbert von Chamisso Prize. She was Poetic lecturer at  the RheinMain University of Applied Sciences. In January 2008, her literary blog  was awarded with the Isla-Volante Literature Prize, while in May of the same year she won the MDR-Literaturpreis.

Works

 Wüstenhimmel Sternenland, Erzählungen. Arche Verlag Zürich/Hamburg 2004, 
 Gespräch in Meeresnähe, Roman. Arche Verlag, Zürich/Hamburg 2005, 
 brennt, Roman. DuMont Verlag, Köln 2010, 
 das zehn-zeilen-buch", 52 ultra kurzgeschichten. Edition AZUR, Dresden 2010, 
 Vorlesungen der Wiesbadener Poetikdozentur. In: nehmen sie mich beim wort im kreuzverhör. Fischer Verlag, 2010. 
 Das Eigenartige Haus, (Illustr.: Rittiner und Gomez). edition taberna kritika, Bern 2012, 
 "Kitsune. Three micro-novels", (Illustr.: Rittiner und Gomez). edition AZUR, Dresden 2016,

Awards
 Scholarship literature of the Landes Baden-Württemberg
 Scholarship of the Deutschen Literaturfonds
 Scholarship of the Stiftung Preußische Seehandlung
 Scholarship of the Robert Bosch Stiftung
 Scholarship of the Berliner Senatsverwaltung für Kultur
 Residency at the art academy of Schloss Wiepersdorf
 Residency at the Stuttgarter Schriftstellerhaus
 Writer in Residence at the Queen Mary University of London
 Writer in Residence at the University of Nottingham
 Nominated for the Ingeborg-Bachmann-Preis 2008
 Adelbert-von-Chamisso-Förderpreis
 MDR-Literaturpreis
 Isla-Volante-Literaturprize for the literary webblog zehn zeilen
 Poetics lecturer at the RheinMain University of Applied Sciences

External links
 
 Website-Titel
 das zehn-zeilen-buch
 "Es gibt ein Teheran in mir" auf: www.welt.de, 25. Februar 2006
 Biographisches Interview (BR / Video / ca. 50 min)

References

German women novelists
1963 births
People from Tehran
Living people
Iranian emigrants to Germany
Iranian people of German descent
German women dramatists and playwrights
21st-century German dramatists and playwrights
21st-century German novelists
People associated with Queen Mary University of London
People associated with the University of Nottingham
21st-century German women writers